State Highway 20 (abbreviated SH-20) is a highway in northeastern Oklahoma. Its eastern terminus is at the corner of Oklahoma, Arkansas, and Missouri near Southwest City, Missouri; its western terminus is at State Highway 18 near Ralston. It has no lettered spur routes.

Route description

SH-20 begins just north of the Arkansas River at SH-18 near Ralston. From there, it heads east through Osage County for 20 miles (32 km) without crossing any other highway. At mile 20.4, it meets State Highway 99 in Hominy. East of Hominy, SH-20 crosses Lake Skiatook before passing through Skiatook and entering Tulsa County. Shortly after entering Tulsa County, SH-20 has a junction with SH-11. Four miles later, it has an interchange with US-75. After running through Collinsville, it turns southward onto the US-169 freeway.

SH-20 splits from US-169 north of Owasso. It then enters Claremore, where it meets SH-88 and SH-66 (old Route 66). It connects to the Claremore toll plaza on I-44/Will Rogers Turnpike. East of Claremore, SH-20 becomes a divided expressway before intersecting US-69 in Pryor. West of Salina, the highway bridges Lake Hudson. In Salina, SH-20 meets SH-82, with which it begins a concurrency.

Headed north from Salina, the two highways begin to cross some mountainous terrain. The highways provide access to Spavinaw State Park, before running through the town of Spavinaw, Oklahoma. North of Spavinaw, SH-20 splits off to the east, running through unincorporated Chloeta and serving as the eastern terminus of SH-28. SH-20 overlaps US-59/State Highway 10 through Jay. SH-20 then splits off to the east, running  to the Arkansas line.

The easternmost miles run north/south along the Oklahoma–Arkansas state line, and along this stretch the highway overlaps Arkansas's Highway 43. The highway continues northward into Missouri at the point where the Oklahoma, Arkansas and Missouri borders meet, and thereafter becomes Missouri Route 43.

History
On April 10, 2008, a section of SH-20 in Rogers County near Keetonville, west of Claremore, was closed due to a landside caused by heavy rains. A  section of roadbed was washed away, forming a large crack in the pavement and damaging the guardrail. The highway was re-opened June 5, 2008 after being repaired.

Major junctions

References

External links
 SH-20 at OKHighways.com
 OK-20 on Two Wheel Oklahoma

020
Transportation in Osage County, Oklahoma
Transportation in Tulsa County, Oklahoma
Transportation in Rogers County, Oklahoma
Transportation in Mayes County, Oklahoma
Transportation in Delaware County, Oklahoma